Bhatgaon is a village in Sarojaninagar block of Lucknow district, Uttar Pradesh, India. As of 2011, its population was 7,131, in 1,353 households. A regular market is held here. The village lands cover an area of 981.3 hectares, of which 681.9 (69.4%) were farmland in 2011. Areas under non-agricultural use covered 67.5 hectares, or 6.9% of the total village area.

History 
Around the turn of the 20th century, Bhatgaon was described as a "very large village in the south-west of the pargana" of Bijnaur, held by a Sheikh family in pattidari tenure. It was surrounded by tanks, which formed the main source of irrigation. The soil was described as "a light loam with a tendency to sand", and the main crops grown here were bajra, barley, and rice. The 1901 census recorded a population of 2,105 people, of whom 294 were Muslim; the main Hindu group was the Kachhis. There was a small school, which had been established in 1864.

References 

Villages in Lucknow district